The 2022–23 Croatian Second Football League (also known as Druga Nogometna Liga and 2. NL) will be the 32nd edition of the third tier of Croatian football league and 1st season of the restructured Druga nogometna liga.

The league is contested by 16 teams and played in a triple round robin format.

Teams
The following teams will compete in the 2022–23 Druga NL.

Changes
Vukovar 1991 was promoted to the 2022–23 Prva NL, while 14 eastern, 9 northern, 16 southern, 16 centrist and 12 western clubs were relegated to 2022–23 Treća NL due new leagues system.

New clubs are Croatia Zmijavci, Sesvete, Osijek II and Opatija which were relegated from 2021–22 Druga HNL and 10 best placed third tier teams with two playoff winners.

Due to the bankruptcy, Inter Zaprešić, who was scheduled to play in the Croatian second level, was dissolved before the season. Croatia Zmijavci was promoted back to Croatian first league to fill their spot.

Now opened spot was taken by the Trnje who beat Hrvatski Vitez Posedarje in the play-offs.

Stadia and locations

League table

Results

References 

Croatia
3